The Golden Mile is the fertile plain lying between Bad Breisig and Remagen to the left of the river Rhine in Germany. The epithet "golden" refers to the fertility of the soil in this area.

This section of the Rhine valley achieved notoriety as a result of the Golden Mile prisoner-of-war camp in which, in spring 1945, German soldiers were detained in the open.

Literature 
Eckart Probst: Die Auflösung des Kriegsgefangenenlagers Goldene Meile 1945 - Ein Zeitzeuge erinnert sich, in: Kreisverwaltung Ahrweiler (publ.): Heimatjahrbuch des Kreises Ahrweiler 2004, Bad Neuenahr-Ahrweiler, 2003, p. 207
Johannes Friedhelm Luxem: Gedenken und Erinnern eines Zeitzeugen an das Kriegsgefangenenlager zwischen Remagen und Sinzig im Jahre 1945, in: Kreisverwaltung Ahrweiler (Hrsg.): 'Heimatjahrbuch des Kreises Ahrweiler 2004', Bad Neuenahr-Ahrweiler, 2003, p. 201
Kurt Kleemann: Die Kriegsgefangenenlager Remagen und Sinzig 1945, Sonderdruck aus: 'Jahrbuch für westdeutsche Landesgeschichte 20', 1994, pp. 451-483
Hans-Ulrich Reiffen: Das Rheinwiesenlager Sinzig-Remagen 1945, Sinzig, 1995

External links 
Heino Möhring: 'Die Goldene Meile, ein »Amphitheater« natürlicher Schönheiten. Die Reise der Engländerin Ann Radcliffe im Sommer des Jahres 1792', in: Kreisverwaltung Ahrweiler (Hrsg.): 'Heimatjahrbuch 1999', Bad Neuenahr-Ahrweiler, 1998
Kremer, Bruno P.: 'Die Goldene Meile in geologischer Sicht', in: Kreisverwaltung Ahrweiler (Hrsg.): 'Heimatjahrbuch 1994', Bad Neuenahr-Ahrweiler, 1993
Dr. Günther Schell: 'Das Mittelrheingebiet und die »Goldene Meile«', in: Kreisverwaltung Ahrweiler (Hrsg.): 'Heimatjahrbuch 1984', Bad Neuenahr-Ahrweiler, 1983

Regions of Rhineland-Palatinate
Ahrweiler (district)